Erechthias macrozyga is a species of moth in the family Tineidae. It was described by Edward Meyrick in 1916. This species is endemic to New Zealand. The holotype specimen of this species was collected at Tisbury, Invercargill by Alfred Philpott.

References

External links
Image of type specimen of Erechthias macrozyga

Moths described in 1916
Erechthiinae
Moths of New Zealand
Endemic fauna of New Zealand
Taxa named by Edward Meyrick
Endemic moths of New Zealand